Haykavan (also Romanized as Haikavan and Aykavan; until 1946, T'apadibi) is a town in the Armavir Province of Armenia.

See also 
Armavir Province

References 
 (as Aykavan)

World Gazeteer: Armenia – World-Gazetteer.com

Populated places in Armavir Province